Azra Quraishi (22 September 1945 – 22 November 2002) was a leading botanist from Pakistan. She worked on the improvement of potato production in Pakistan and became known for her work on tissue culture. She was given the Borlaug Award in 1997 and the Ordre des Palmes académiques in 2002. She is credited with raising potato production in Pakistan by 5%.

Early life and education
Quraishi was born in 1945 in Rajasthan, India, to Abdus Sattar Quraishi and Salma Quraishi. Her family moved to Rawalpindi in Pakistan in the upheaval caused by the British orchestrated "partition of India". She obtained her first degree from Gordon College in her home city and, in 1966, she obtained her master's degree from the University of the Punjab in Lahore.

After lecturing for several years at Viqar-un-Nisa Girls College in Rawalpindi, Quraishi traveled overseas on a Government of Pakistan scholarship. As a result, she obtained a master's degree in 1973 for her tissue culture research on Solanum tuberosum var., BF-15.  Within three years she had obtained her doctorate from the University of Paris-Sud in Orsay, France for related work which was a "Study of callogenesis and organogenesis from explant of in vitro shoots in Solanum tuberosum var., BF-15".

Scientific career
Azra Quraishi created virus-free seed potatoes in Pakistan. This research affected her country's trading position as it reduced the need to import seed potatoes from the Netherlands as she had increased Pakistan's annual potato production by 5%. This contribution brought her national recognition. Azra Quraishi also "successfully launched projects of micropropagation of banana, date palm, and screening salt tolerance through tissue culture in local wheat and rice cultivars." She had published more than 140 research papers.

Awards and recognition
Her contributions earned Azra Quraishi many awards:
 Hamdard Pakistan Award in 1992 
 Norman Borlaug Award for Field Research and Application in 1997 
Pakistan Agricultural Research Council (PARC/PARSA) Millenium Award for Best Scientist in 2001 
 France's Ordre des Palmes académiques in 2002

At a memorial ceremony in Islamabad on 26 November 2002, Badruddin Soomro, Chairman PARC, announced that the Institute of Agriculture Biotechnology and Genetics Research (IABGR) would be renamed in Quraishi's honour. Soomro acknowledged that the glass ceiling had prevented Quraishi from the promotion she deserved. She had been promoted to be the Chief Scientific Officer and Deputy Director General, Agriculture Biotechnology Institute, Pakistan Agricultural Research Council (PARC). Quraishi had no children but she contributed towards her nephew and the financial costs of dozens of poor children.

Azra Quraishi was a member of several societies including the Pakistan Botanical Society.

Publications
Quraishi published over 140 scientific research papers in internationally recognized scientific journals and 85 popular science articles. Quraishi participated in over 70 national and international conferences, symposia or seminars in Pakistan, India, Canada, Egypt, Philippine, USA, UK, India, Jordan, Bangladesh, and, in the month before her death, China.

Death 
Azra Quraishi died on 22 November 2002 at age 57.

References 

Pakistani scholars
Pakistani women scientists
1945 births
2002 deaths
Pakistani people of Rajasthani descent
Government Gordon College alumni
Chevaliers of the Ordre des Palmes Académiques
Pakistani botanists